The International Biometric Society (IBS) is an international professional and academic society promoting the development and application of statistical and mathematical theory and methods in the biosciences, including biostatistics.
It sponsors the International Biometric Conference (IBC), held every two years.

History 
The society was founded on September 6, 1947, at the First International Biometric Conference at Woods Hole, Massachusetts, US. Its first president was Ronald Fisher and its first secretary was Chester Ittner Bliss.

Regions and networks 
The society is organized into (mostly national) regions and (international) networks, many of which also hold their own conferences.

Publications 
It publishes the journal Biometrics, the Journal of Agricultural, Biological, and Environmental Statistics (JABES) jointly with the American Statistical Association, the quarterly newsletter Biometric Bulletin, and the regional journal Biometrical Journal (formerly Biometrische Zeitschrift).

Past presidents

References

Further reading

External links
 International Biometric Society (IBS)
 Biometrical Journal
 Biometrics
 Biometric Bulletin
 Journal of Agricultural, Biological and Environmental Statistics (JABES)

Statistical societies
Organizations established in 1947
1947 establishments in Massachusetts